Zishan Shah (born 1 October 1987 in Brøndby) is a Danish cricketer who played for Denmark in the 2005 ICC Trophy.

Career
In May 2019, he was named in Denmark's squad for the Regional Finals of the 2018–19 ICC T20 World Cup Europe Qualifier tournament in Guernsey. He made his Twenty20 International (T20I) debut for Denmark, against Jersey, on 16 June 2019.

In August 2019, he was named in Denmark's squad for the 2019 Malaysia Cricket World Cup Challenge League A tournament.

References

External links
 

1987 births
Living people
Danish cricketers
Denmark Twenty20 International cricketers
People from Brøndby Municipality
Danish people of Pakistani descent
Sportspeople from the Capital Region of Denmark